Alfredo Bodoira (28 August 1911 – 3 August 1989 in Torino) was an Italian professional football player, who played as a goalkeeper.

Career
Bodoira was notably a part of the Grande Torino side between 1941 and 1946. Aside from striker Guglielmo Gabetto, he is the only player to win the Italian championship with both Juventus F.C. (1931; he played for the club between 1930 and 1941) and cross-city rivals Torino F.C. (1943; he played with the club from 1941 to 1946). He also played for Anconitana, Alessandria, and Cesena throughout his career.

Following his retirement, he also coached Fossanese in the lower divisions between 1953 and 1954.

Honours
Juventus F.C.
 Serie A champion: 1930–31.
 Coppa Italia winner: 1937–38.

Torino F.C.
 Serie A champion: 1942–43.
 Coppa Italia winner: 1942–43.

References

1911 births
1989 deaths
Italian footballers
Serie A players
Juventus F.C. players
A.C. Ancona players
Torino F.C. players
U.S. Alessandria Calcio 1912 players
A.C. Cesena players
Association football goalkeepers